The Dicionário Cravo Albin da Música Popular Brasileira (Cravo Albin Dictionary of Brazilian Pop Music) is a non-commercial website maintained by the Instituto Cultural Cravo Albin (Cravo Albin Cultural Institute). Its objective is to gather information about artists, musicians and musical groups of música popular brasileira (MPB).

A 2006 physical version of the dictionary by Editora Paracatu, named the Dicionário Houaiss Ilustrado – Música Popular Brasileira, contained information about  authors, interpreters, groups, associations, blocs and styles of Brazilian music, and the discography of  musicians and musical groups.

References

Brazilian music websites
Internet properties established in 2006
Música Popular Brasileira
Online dictionaries
C